Prosellodrilus amplisetosus is a species of earthworm native to Aquitaine in south-western France; it has also been introduced to a site in County Louth, Ireland.

References

Lumbricidae
Endemic invertebrates of Metropolitan France
Animals described in 1972